Mazaaq is a 1975 Bollywood comedy film directed by Haidar Ali. It stars Vinod Mehra, Moushumi Chatterjee, Aruna Irani, Mehmood in lead roles and music by R. D. Burman.

Cast
Vinod Mehra as Vinod 
Moushumi Chatterjee as Moushumi 
Aruna Irani as Dr. A. Irani
Mehmood as Raja 
Iftekhar as Narang   
Asrani as Murli / Marlon 
Kanhaiyalal as Murli's Father 
Agha as Gaylord Hotel Manager 
Mukri as Chunnilal Paan Wala 
Paintal as Chauffeur    
Viju Khote as Gopi

Soundtrack
The music of the film was composed by R.D. Burman, while were written by Yogesh.

Track listing

External links
 

1975 films
1970s Hindi-language films
Films scored by R. D. Burman